The Armstrong School District is a large, public school district which encompasses approximately . The District is one of the 500 public school districts of Pennsylvania. In Armstrong County, Pennsylvania, Armstrong School District covers the Boroughs of Applewold, Atwood, Dayton, Elderton, Ford City, Ford Cliff, Kittanning, Manorville, Rural Valley, West Kittanning and Worthington and the Townships of Bethel Township, Boggs Township, Burrell Township, Cadogan Township, Cowanshannock Township, East Franklin Township, Kittanning Township, Manor Township, North Buffalo Township, Pine Township, Plumcreek Township, Rayburn Township, South Bend Township, Valley Township, Washington Township, Wayne Township and West Franklin Township.  In Indiana County, Pennsylvania the district includes the Borough of Smicksburg and West Mahoning Township.  According to 2000 federal census data, it served a resident population of 44,970. By 2010, the District's population declined to 43,301 people. In 2009, Armstrong School District residents' per capita income was $15,449, while the median family income was $36,907.

In 2013, Armstrong School District operated ten public schools. A new junior-senior high school was completed in 2015. As such, two older high school buildings were closed. The district was established in 1966 when Pennsylvania consolidated several smaller school districts.

Current schools include: Armstrong Junior-Senior High School (7-12); Dayton Elementary School (K-6); Elderton Elementary School (K-6); Lenape Elementary School (K-6); Shannock Valley Elementary School (K-6); West Hills Primary (K-3); West Hills Intermediate School (4-6); and West Shamokin Junior-Senior High School (7-12).

High school students may also choose to attend Lenape Tech  for vocational training. The ARIN Intermediate Unit IU28 provides the district with a wide variety of services like specialized education for disabled students and hearing, speech and visual disability services and professional development for staff and faculty.

Schools
West Hills Primary School
181 Heritage Park Dr., Kittaning, PA 16201

West Hills Intermediate School
175 Heritage Park Dr., Kittanning, PA 16201

Lenape Elementary School - Kindergarten – grade 6
230 Center Ave., Ford City, PA 16226

Shannock Valley Elementary School

Armstrong Junior Senior High School - grades 7–12
300 Buffington Dr., Kittaning, PA, 16201

West Shamokin Jr./Sr. High School - grades 7–12

Armstrong School District Cyber Academy - online school - grades 7–12 .

Closed schools
In 2000, the Armstrong School Board closed several schools due to declining enrollment:

 Dayton Jr/Sr High School and Shannock Valley Jr/Sr High School.
 East Franklin Elementary School
 North Buffalo Elementary School
 Worthington High School (Closed 1980s)
 East Brady Jr/Sr High School (Closed, early 1990s, partially consolidated with Kittanning High School, other students sent to Karns City Jr/Sr High School in the Karns City School District)
 Elderton Jr/Sr High School Closed June 2012 see page for more information
Kittanning Township Elementary School - students shifted to Lenape Elementary in Ford City (closed 2012)
Kittanning Senior High School - Closed 2015
Ford City Junior Senior High School - Closed 2015
Kittanning Junior High School - Closed 2015

References

External links
Armstrong School District
Former Armstrong School District website
ASD Foundation
ARIN IU 28 
Lenape Tech School 

Kittanning, Pennsylvania
School districts established in 1966
Education in Pittsburgh area
School districts in Armstrong County, Pennsylvania
School districts in Indiana County, Pennsylvania
1966 establishments in Pennsylvania